The  Dmitri Pokrovsky Ensemble was founded by  Dmitri Pokrovsky (1944–1996) together with his wife and lifelong partner, Tamara Smyslova, in Moscow  in 1973 as an experimental singing group under folk Commission of the URSS Сomposers Union.The appearance of this team completely changed in modern society the understanding and view of folklore. For the first time in this  Ensemble came together scientific approach to the study of folklore and brilliant stage  presentation of it. Professional musicians belonging to  the city culture  had to master a large number  very dissimilar styles of Russian village music. The Pokrovsky Ensemble became  the first professional groups who began to study the Russian folk music  from authentic  village musicians  in numerous  folklore expeditions. Participants of Pokrovsky Ensemble  has been recording, learning  and then performing  very different traditions, styles  and manners of folk singing, playing and dancing, trying to penetrate the rules of its existence, understand the laws of its development. Dmitri Pokrovsky was one of the first musicians who  tried to bridge the gap between the old and new music. Pokrovsky Ensemble became the starting point in the search for new ways to stage implementation of folk music and marked the beginning of a Russian  wave in the World music.

The Ensemble participated in Paul Winter Consort tour promoting their joint album Earthbeat and many various international festivals (Tokyo Summer Festival, Berliner Festwochen, etc.). The Ensemble has worked with numerous famous musicians and composers (Michael Tilson Thomas, Thomas Ades, Vladimir Martynov, Iraida Yusupova, Anton Batagov, Alexey Aygi, Vladimir Nikolaev, Alexey Shelygin, Tatiana Grindenko, Labèque sisters,  Felix Korobov, Vladimir Dashkevich, Teodor Currentzis, Ludovic Morlot, M. Shmotova, Daniel Kawka (:fr:Daniel Kawka) etc.) It has performed at  American White House, Tanglewood, Carnegie Hall, Sydney Opera, Vienna, Tokyo, Los-Angeles, San Francisco and Berlin Philharmonias, Benaroya Hall Seattle etc. Innovative interpretation of Stravinsky's masterpiece  "Les Noces "in 1994 brought Ensemble undeniable success and international recognition. The Pokrovsky Ensemble has toured throughout the former USSR and Russia, the United States, Germany, Austria, England, Switzerland, Canada, Australia, Netherlands, Israel, Finland, Japan, Italy, Belgium etc. Ensemble recordings include "Faces of Russia" (Trikont label, US)"Wild Field", a survey of Russian folk music released by Peter Gabriel's Real World label, "Earthbeat", an artistic collaboration with the Paul Winter Consort (Living Music, US ), Igor Stravinsky's "Les Noces"(Electra-Nonesuch, US), "Night in Galicia" (V.Martynov) ( CCn'C Records, Germany), "Mother Russia" (Fivepro.Rec, Russia), "Voices of Frozen Land" of Alexander Raskatov (NBELIVE, Netherlands) etc. The Ensemble has successfully cooperated with several  theatrical directors and filmmakers (Yuri Lubimov, Nikita Mikhalkov, Mikhail Schweitzer, Andrey Smirnov, Valery Fokin, Kama Ginkas, V.Mirzoev etc.).

Since Dmitri Pokrovsky's death in 1996 the ensemble has changed its face dramatically. Maria Nefedova (Russian: Нефёдова Мария Петровна) and Olga Yukecheva (Russian: Юкечева Ольга Львовна) are now its music director and stage director respectively. The Ensemble goes on tours, performs new programs of folk, sacred and modern music include "Faces of Russia", "The Man Lives Like The Grass Grows" – Russian spiritual music, "Russian Wedding", "Russian Christmas", "From Romance to Limerick", "Russian Length Song", "Vivat, Russia!" – songs and music of Peter The Great time, "Russian Folk Theatre", program "Romancein Letters" in honor of the Victory in Patriotic War of 1812 (Moscow International House of Music, 2013), Russian Tales (Moscow International House of Music, 2013), The Tale of Igor's Campaign (Moscow International House of Music, 2013), "Stimmung" (Karlheinz Stockhausen), and Falún (Béla Bartók) among others.
In 2018, the Ensemble won the Yuri Lubimov Public Award.
In 2023 the Dmitry Pokrovsky Ensemble celebrated its 50th anniversary with a series of concerts. The anniversary performance "From Folklore to Avant-garde" took place on February 15 at the Moscow Conservatory.

Discography

 1978  — Russian Folk Polyphony. Мелодия USSR
 1983  — :ru:Кругозор (журнал, СССР) USSR.
 1988  — :ru:Камбурова, Елена Антоновна. Мелодия USSR
 1987  — Earthbeat. Living Music, US
 1988  — Paul Winter Wolf Eyes. Living Music, US
 1989\1991 — Faces of Russia. Trikont Label, US
 1990  — Holy Evening. Bally Bally Rec US
 1991  — Earth (Voices of a Planet). (Paul Winter Consort & Friends). Living Music, US
 1991  — The Wild Field. Realworld, US
 1992  — Us Peter Gabriel (track 1) Realworld, US
 1994  — Les noces, Igor Stravinsky. Electra Nonesuch, US
 1994  — Solstice Live (Paul Winter Consort & Friends) Living Music, US
 1999  — Night in Galicia Erdenklang musikverlag, CCn'C, Germany
 2000  — Anton Batagov Best before 02.2000 Long Arms Rec, Russia
 2001(2014 reissue)  — Mother Russia. Fivepro Records, Russia
 2001  — Alexander Raskatov Voices of Frozen Land  NBE LIVE, Netherlands
 2005 — Anton Batagov From to beginning up to the end. Long Arms Rec, Russia
 2005 — Silver Solstice (Paul Winter Consort & Friends) Earth Music Production, LLC, US
 2008 — Nor close to town nor far. Russia
 2008-2009 — Russian Chorus Music:Pokrovsky Ensemble (The worlds roots music library). King Record Co.Ltd. Japan.
 2010 (recording)-2014 (edition) — Kursky Songs. Russia
 2010 (recording)-2014 (edition) — Vivat Russia!. Russia
 2016 — Human Lives as Grass Grows 2 CD. Russia
 2016 — Alexey Shelygin The Tale of Igor's Campaign. Russia
 2016 — Iraida Yusupova Russian Album, to the twentieth anniversary of cooperation with Pokrovsky Ensemble. Russia
 2020 — Remember You in Songs (2 CD, Songs of the World war 1). Russia
 2020 — The Flame of Battle and Love (2 CD, Songs of the Patriotic war of 1812). Russia

References

Russian world music groups
Russian folk music groups
Vocal ensembles
Contemporary classical music ensembles
Soviet performing ensembles